Troides amphrysus, the Malay birdwing, is a birdwing butterfly in the genus Troides in the family Papilionidae.

Taxonomy

Subspecies
T. a. amphrysus (Java, Bali)
T. a. ruficollis (Butler, 1879 (Peninsular Malaya, Thailand, Burma)
T. a. euthydemus (Fruhstorfer, 1913 (Sumatra)
T. a. actinotia Jordan, 1909 (southern Borneo)
T. a. flavicollis (Druce, 1873) (northern Borneo)
T. a. niasicus (Fruhstorfer, 1898) (Nias)
T. a. vistara Fruhstorfer, 1906 (Batu Island)
T. a. astrea Hayami, 1992 (Banyak Island)
T. a. arkumene Hayami, 1994 (Tioman)
T. a. chrysomelas Parrott & Schmid, 1984 (Natuna)
T. a. simeuluensis Ohya, 1985 (Simeuluë, Babi Island)
T. a. perintis Kobayashi, 1986 (Tambelan Island)
T. a. kuris Kobayashi & Hayami, 1987 (Anambas Island)
T. a. hilbert Hayami, 1992 (Karimata)
T. a. merah Kobayashi & Hayami, 1992 (Simuk, Batu Island)
T. a. zeus Kobayashi & Hayami, 1992 (Sipora, Siberut, Mentawai)
T. a. naokoae (Morita, 1996) (Langkawi)
T. a. kecilensis (Schäffler, 1999) (P. Laut Kecil)

Related species
Troides amphrysus is a member of the Troides amphrysus species group. The members of this clade are:

Troides amphrysus (Cramer, [1779])
Troides andromache (Staudinger, 1892)
Troides cuneifera (Oberthür, 1879)
Troides miranda (Butler, 1869)

Description

Male. The uppersides of the forewings are black or dark brown, with veins bordered by pale yellow. The uppersides of the hindwings are golden yellow, with black veins and black spots at the edges.

Female. The basic colour of the females is black or dark brown, with veins bordered by white. The uppersides of the hindwings have a smaller golden-yellow area at the base and several yellow spots at the edges.

In both sexes the undersides are similar to the uppersides. The abdomen is yellow, while the head and thorax are black.

Life history

The egg is large and round and a pearly colour. Eggs are deposited on the food plant and the incubation period is two weeks.
The first instar larva is black and bears numerous orange tubercles with short, black, branched spines. The intermediate instars 2, 3 and 4 are black. The thoracic segments have eight tubercles and the abdominal segments have six each. These are fleshy and lack spines. The dorsal tubercles of the 2nd, 3rd, 6th, and the 7th abdominal segments, are black. All the other tubercles are bright orange. In the penultimate and final instars the head is black and the thorax and abdomen is dark coffee brown. There is no saddle mark in this species. The tubercles are largely uniform in size, shape and of the ground colour. They are incline posteriorly and the apices are bent forwards to form small hooks. This species is not monophagous. The larvae feed on Aristolochia - A. acuminata and A. foveolata and on various Thottea species.

The pupa is yellowish green and is marked with greyish veins as in a leaf. It has a broad dorsal saddle mark, this is lemon yellow transversely marked with brown streaks. The abdomen has three pairs of sharp dorsal processes, directed laterally. The pupal stage lasts from 27 to 30 days.

Distribution and habitat

This species can be found in the Australasian realm and in the Indomalayan realm, from Myanmar to Indonesia. The habitat is primary and secondary rainforest.

Behaviour
In the morning the butterflies fly at 20 to 30 m high in the canopy. Females rest on the foliage, while males glide in broad circles above them. The males perform an elaborate quivering courtship display several metres above the females, before copulation. Later in the day both sexes descend to feed on flowering trees and bushes including Lantana.

References

 Butterflycorner.net
 Biolib
 Morita, S. 1996: A new subspecies of Troides amphrysus from Langkawi Is., Malaysia. Wallace 2: 5.

Kurt Rumbucher, Béla von Knötgen and Oliver Schäffler, Knötgen 1999 Part 7, Papilionidae IV. Troides II., amphrysus-group in Erich Bauer and Thomas Frankenbach Eds. Butterflies of the World. Keltern: Goecke & Evers .

External links

Nagypal
Consortium for the Barcode of Life T. amphrysus amphrysus at Barcode of Life
T. amphrysus ruficollis at Barcode of Life
Butterflycorner Images from Naturhistorisches Museum Wien (English/German)
T. amphrysus ruficollis at Butterflies of Indochina

Amphrysus
Butterflies described in 1779
Butterflies of Asia
Butterflies of Borneo
Butterflies of Indochina
Butterflies of Indonesia